Ismael Benktib (born 4 July 1998) is a professional footballer who plays for SCC Mohammedia as a central midfielder. Born in Spain, he represented Morocco at youth international levels.

Club career
Born in L'Ametlla del Vallès, Barcelona, Catalonia, Benktib joined Elche CF's youth setup in 2014, from Girona FC. He made his senior debut with the reserves on 23 August 2015, starting in a 1–0 Tercera División away win against FC Jove Español.

On 7 June 2016, Benktib renewed his contract with the club. He made his first-team debut on 10 September of the following year, coming on as a late substitute for Juan José Collantes in a 4–1 home routing of CF Peralada-Girona B in the Segunda División B championship.

On 29 May 2018, Elche announced that Benktib's contract was extended until 2021, after exercising the automatic renewal option in his previous deal; the club also announced that he would become a permanent member of the main squad in the 2018–19 campaign. Four days later, however, his agent stated that his contract would only be renewed for one further year if the club achieved promotion to Segunda División; Elche later denied the claims.

In September 2018, Benktib started training with Recreativo de Huelva and signed a contract with the club afterwards. Elche later took a legal action against the player due to a "breach of contract", which the federation dismissed; he was registered by his new club in October.

On 23 January 2019, after not playing a single minute with Recreativo, Benktib joined Levante UD's B-team, also in the third division. Roughly one year later, after again featuring rarely, he terminated his contract and returned to Elche, being again assigned to their reserve side.

On 17 August 2020, Benktib agreed to a two-year contract with Racing de Santander, recently relegated to the division three. He left the club the following 4 February with only four matches, and was transferred to Moroccan side Maghreb de Fès.

On February 1, 2022, Benktib accepted a two-year contract with SCC Mohammedia, who are currently playing in Botola. He left the club on February 1 Maghreb de Fès where he played more than 21 matches for 1 goals.

References

External links

1998 births
Living people
People from Vallès Oriental
Sportspeople from the Province of Barcelona
Spanish footballers
Footballers from Catalonia
Moroccan footballers
Association football midfielders
Segunda División B players
Tercera División players
Elche CF Ilicitano footballers
Elche CF players
Recreativo de Huelva players
Atlético Levante UD players
Racing de Santander players
Botola players
Maghreb de Fès players
Morocco under-20 international footballers